John Levra (born October 2, 1937) is a former American football player and coach. He served as the head football coach at New Mexico Highlands University from 1967 to 1970, and Stephen F. Austin University from 1971 until 1974, compiling a career college football record of 57–24–1.

Head coaching record

References

1937 births
Living people
American football linebackers
American football offensive guards
BC Lions coaches
Buffalo Bills coaches
Chicago Bears coaches
Denver Broncos coaches
Kansas Jayhawks football coaches
Minnesota Vikings coaches
New Mexico Highlands Cowboys football coaches
New Orleans Saints coaches
North Texas Mean Green football coaches
People from Crawford County, Kansas
Pittsburg State Gorillas football players
Players of American football from Kansas
Stephen F. Austin Lumberjacks football coaches